Nova Gorica is a town in western Slovenia, on the border with Italy. It is the seat of the Municipality of Nova Gorica. Nova Gorica is a planned town, built according to the principles of modernist architecture after 1947, when the Paris Peace Treaty established a new border between Yugoslavia and Italy, leaving nearby Gorizia outside the borders of Yugoslavia and thus cutting off the Soča Valley, the Vipava Valley, the Gorizia Hills and the northwestern Karst Plateau from their traditional regional urban centre. Since 1948, Nova Gorica has replaced Gorizia as the principal urban centre of the Gorizia region, as the northern part of the Slovenian Littoral has been traditionally called.

Since May 2011, Nova Gorica has been joined together with Gorizia and Šempeter-Vrtojba in a common trans-border metropolitan zone, administered by a joint administration board.

Name 

The name Nova Gorica means 'new Gorizia'. The origin of the name Gorizia/Gorica itself is Slavic. The common local term for the town is Gorica (i.e., without the modifier nova 'new'), while residents tend to refer to the neighboring Italian town as Stara Gorica (i.e., 'old Gorizia'). This use is also reflected in Slovenian license plates (GO for Gorica), as well as in the name of the local association football club ND Gorica. The word gorica is a diminutive form of the Slovene common noun gora 'hill'. In archaic Slovene, it also meant 'vineyard'. It is a common toponym in Slovenia and in other areas of Slovene settlement, as well as more generally in areas that have or historically had a Slavic-speaking population.

History 

In 1947, following World War II, Italy signed a peace treaty with the Allies, including Socialist Yugoslavia. The treaty transferred most of the Slovene-inhabited areas of the Province of Gorizia to Yugoslavia. The town of Gorizia itself, however, remained under Italian rule. The new border cut the city off from its northern and eastern suburbs. Around 40% of the municipality's territory was transferred to Yugoslavia, including the suburbs of Solkan, Šempeter, Kromberk, Rožna Dolina, and Pristava. Together, these areas had a population of around 10,000 (almost exclusively Slovenes, with a tiny Friulian-speaking minority), or around one fifth of the municipality's population. However, they lacked a cohesive structure, and were poorly connected. In order to overcome this problem, the Communist authorities of the Socialist Republic of Slovenia decided to build a new settlement that would connect these suburbs into a new urban space. The new town was called Nova Gorica or "New Gorizia". The project had the personal backing of Marshal Tito, Yugoslavia's Communist leader. The project was commissioned to the Slovenian architect Edvard Ravnikar, a former pupil of Le Corbusier. The first projects were laid out in winter of 1947, and the construction began at the beginning of the following year. 

The city was formally established as an urban municipality in 1952, incorporating the older settlements of Solkan, Kromberk and Rožna Dolina, which thus became, somewhat reluctantly, suburbs of Nova Gorica. The building of the town continued throughout the 1950s and 1960s, reaching the current extent by the mid 1980s. In the early 1990s, all of the aforementioned older suburbs acquired again the status of independent settlements. This was however a purely symbolic act that only affected the official statistics on population: because of this, Nova Gorica dropped from the list of 10 largest towns in Slovenia. It nevertheless remains the second largest urban conglomeration in western Slovenia, after Koper.

Culture and education 
Nova Gorica hosts one of the three national theatres in Slovenia. The  is also located in the town's Kromberk district, hosted in Kromberk Castle.

The University of Nova Gorica is located in the suburb of Rožna Dolina. The Nova Gorica Grammar School, located in the city centre, is one of the most renowned high schools in Slovenia.

The cultural magazine Razpotja is published in Nova Gorica.

Kostanjevica Hill 

To the south of the town stands Kostanjevica Hill, home to the Church of the Annunciation of Our Lady and a 17th-century Franciscan monastery with rich treasures from the past. The last members of the Bourbons, the French royal family, are buried in a crypt beneath the church (Charles X himself, and members of his family and entourage including his son Louis-Antoine de France, and his grandson Henri d'Artois, nephew of Louis (neither Louis-Antoine nor Henri ever reigned as kings)). He fled France following the revolution in 1830, finding refuge in Gorizia, and eventually died there. Also buried there is Pierre Louis Jean Casimir de Blacas, a Bourbon nobleman who also died in exile (in 1839).

Sveta Gora 

Opposite Kostanjevica Hill, north of the town is the settlement of Sveta Gora with Holy Mount a  peak that has attracted pilgrims for 450 years. The view from there is exceptional, and on a clear day visitors can see as far as Istria, Venice, the Dolomites, and the Kamnik and Julian Alps. The mountain top is home to a magnificent basilica, where concerts are occasionally held, a Franciscan monastery, and a museum of the Battles of the Isonzo.

People

Arts and sciences 
 Diego de Brea, theatre director
 Dean Komel, philosopher
 Mirt Komel, philosopher and author
 Branko Marušič, historian
 Maja Novak, writer
 Dušan Pirjevec Ahac, philosopher and literary critic (born in Solkan, now part of Nova Gorica)
 Katja Perat, poet and essayist
 Uroš Seljak, physicist, cosmologist
 Mitja Velikonja, sociologist
 Erika Vouk, poet
 Danilo Zavrtanik, physicist and scholar
 Marko Peljhan, artist
 Kaja Antlej, VR/AR Museum Heritage and Space Artist

Politics and public service 
 Robert Golob, current Prime Minister of Slovenia
 Borut Pahor, politician, current president of Slovenia
 Zvonko Fišer, former state general prosecutor of Slovenia
 Tomaž Marušič, politician, former minister of justice of Slovenia (1998–2000)
 Vlasta Nussdorfer, child psychologist, former Slovenian ombudsmann 
 Senko Pličanič, lawyer and politician, former minister of justice of Slovenia
 Majda Širca, film critic and politician, minister of culture of Slovenia (2008–2011) 
 Patricija Šulin, politician, member of the European Parliament
 Samuel Žbogar, politician and diplomat, former minister of foreign affairs of Slovenia

Sports 
 Jernej Abramič, slalom canoer
 Jure Franko, ski champion
 Kris Jogan, football player
 Aleš Kokot, football player
 Uroš Kodelja, slalom canoer
 Jan Močnik, basketball player
 Matej Mugerli, road bicycle player
 Jani Šturm, football player
 Eva Mori, volleyball player

Show business 
 Igor Vidmar, rock musician and journalist
 Iztok Mlakar, singer-songwriter and actor
 Aljoša Buha, rock musician

Other 
 Jana Krivec, chess woman grandmaster
 Vojteh Ravnikar, architect
 David Tasić, journalist, political prisoner (JBTZ trial), and publisher

International relations

Twin towns — sister cities 

Nova Gorica is twinned with:

  Aleksandrovac, Serbia
  Klagenfurt, Austria
  Otočac, Croatia
  San Vendemiano, Italy
  Oghuz, Azerbaijan

See also 
 University of Nova Gorica
 Evropski trg

References

External links 
 
 Nova Gorica on Geopedia
 
 

 
Gorica, Nova
Populated places in the City Municipality of Nova Gorica
Cities and towns in the Slovene Littoral
Italy–Slovenia border crossings
New towns
New towns started in the 1940s